is a confectionery and cake company headquartered in Kobe, Japan.  Since its founding in 1931 by Fedor Dmitrievich Morozoff, a white emigre from Russia, Morozoff has grown and now has 952 restaurants and cafes across Japan.

Morozoff is also well known in Japan as the company that first introduced Valentines Day to the nation. In 1936 it ran an advertisement in the Japan Advertiser (a publication catering to foreigners) with the phrase, “For your Valentine, Make A Present of Morozoff’s Fancy Box Chocolates”. However, it wasn't until after World War II in the 1950s and 60s when the department stores and other manufacturers caught on that Valentines Day truly became a national phenomenon.

References

External links

Morozoff Limited official website 

Food and drink companies of Japan
Companies based in Kobe
Companies listed on the Tokyo Stock Exchange
Food and drink companies established in 1931
Confectionery companies
Japanese brands
Japanese companies established in 1931
Confectionery companies of Japan